Sabine Ellerbrock defeated Yui Kamiji in the final, 3–6, 6–4, 6–2 to win the women's singles wheelchair tennis title at the 2014 Australian Open.

Aniek van Koot was the reigning champion, but did not participate due to tendinitis.

Seeds
  Sabine Ellerbrock (champion)
  Yui Kamiji (final)

Draw

References 

General

 Drawsheets on ausopen.com

Specific

Wheelchair Women's Singles
2014 Women's Singles